Ball Arena (formerly known as Pepsi Center) is a multi-purpose indoor arena located in Denver, Colorado. It is situated at Speer Boulevard, a main thoroughfare in downtown Denver, and is served by two nearby exits off Interstate 25. A light rail station is on the western side of the complex. Opened in 1999, it is the home arena of the Denver Nuggets of the National Basketball Association (NBA), the Colorado Avalanche of the National Hockey League (NHL), and the Colorado Mammoth of the National Lacrosse League (NLL).

History

The arena replaced McNichols Sports Arena as the home of the Avalanche and Nuggets. Groundbreaking for the arena was held on November 20, 1997, on the  site. Its completion in October 1999 was marked by a Celine Dion concert. Also included in the complex are a basketball practice facility used by the Nuggets, and the Breckenridge Brewery Mountain House, a restaurant accessible from within and outside the Center itself. The atrium of the building houses a suspended sculpture depicting various hockey and basketball athletes in action poses.

Prior to the 2013–14 season, the octagonal scoreboard that was in use since the arena's opening was replaced with a new four-sided rectangular scoreboard.

Coldplay performed at the arena on August 29, 2016 to a sold out crowd as part of their A Head Full of Dreams Tour. 

From its opening through 2020, the naming rights to the arena were held by PepsiCo, under which it was known as Pepsi Center. On October 22, 2020, the naming rights were sold to Broomfield-based Ball Corporation as part of a global multi-year agreement with Kroenke Sports & Entertainment (KSE), which also makes it the exclusive "sustainability partner" of the arena. As part of the agreement, all KSE-owned sports teams and venues will employ recyclable aluminum products provided by Ball to reduce plastic waste, with Ball Arena to transition to serving concessions in aluminum packaging by 2022.

Events

Hockey 
The arena hosted the 2001 NHL All-Star Game, plus two Stanley Cup Finals series in 2001 and 2022. The Avalanche won both times, the first at home and the second in Tampa. In 2007, the west regionals of the NCAA Division I hockey tournament were held at the arena, hosted by the University of Denver. The following year, it hosted the Frozen Four round of the 2008 tournament.

Basketball 
Pepsi Center hosted the 2005 NBA All-Star Game. The arena has hosted games of the NCAA Division I men's basketball tournament in 2004, 2008, 2011, and 2016. In 2012, the NCAA Women's Final Four was played at the arena, hosted by the Mountain West Conference.

From 2004 to 2006, the arena hosted the Mountain West's men's conference tournament.

Mixed martial arts 
UFC held its first event at the arena, UFC 135, on September 24, 2011. It also hosted UFC 150 the following August.

Professional wrestling 
The arena has hosted various WWE (and in the past, WCW) television broadcasts.

The "Denver Debacle" 

On May 18, 2009, WWE cancelled and moved three events it had scheduled in Colorado, including a WWE Raw taping on May 25, 2009 at Pepsi Center, after the Denver Nuggets were scheduled to play Game 4 of the NBA Western Conference finals against the Los Angeles Lakers on the same date. The affected events were all moved to the Lakers' home arena of Staples Center, while WWE rescheduled an August 7 taping of Raw for Pepsi Center.

In an appearance on KUSA, WWE chairman Vince McMahon accused the "inept management" of team and arena owner Stan Kroenke as having led to the conflict. A KSE spokesperson stated that "despite the propaganda campaign launched by WWE and Chairman Vince McMahon, the KSE team maintained a professional manner throughout this process. We had hoped for, and worked hard toward an amicable resolution - which we verbally had on Tuesday."

The conflict would be referenced during the ensuing May 25 Raw, which opened with a skit between impersonators of Kroenke and Lakers owner Jerry Buss. "Kroenke" boasted about the Nuggets and his indifference to WWE and its fans. Mr. McMahon subsequently entered the ring, jokingly proposed the formation of his own basketball league, the XBA (a reference to his ill-fated XFL), and shoved "Kroenke" down — threatening that people who "push" WWE's fans would get "pushed back". In the main event, a 5-on-5 tag team match was held, where a face team wearing Lakers jerseys (John Cena, Batista, Jerry Lawler, MVP, and Mr. Kennedy) defeated a heel team wearing Nuggets jerseys (Randy Orton, The Miz, Cody Rhodes, Ted DiBiase, and Big Show).

Other events
During the week of July 2–8, 2007, the arena hosted the International Convention and Contests of the Barbershop Harmony Society, a men's singing organization.

After a short-lived race at the Denver Civic Center in the early 1990s, the Champ Car World Series ran an annual street circuit race around Pepsi Center, the Grand Prix of Denver. The race was discontinued after the 2006 event.

The majority of the 2008 Democratic National Convention was held at the arena, culminating with the official nomination of then-Senator Barack Obama as the Democratic Party's candidate for the 2008 presidential election. However, the closing night of the convention, including Obama's acceptance speech, was instead held at Invesco Field at Mile High.

References

External links

1999 establishments in Colorado
Basketball venues in Colorado
College basketball venues in the United States
College ice hockey venues in the United States
Colorado Mammoth
Denver Nuggets venues
Indoor arenas in Colorado
Indoor ice hockey venues in Colorado
Indoor lacrosse venues in the United States
Kroenke Sports & Entertainment
Music venues completed in 1999
Music venues in Colorado
National Basketball Association venues
National Hockey League venues
Sports venues completed in 1999
Sports venues in Denver
Ball Corporation
Colorado Avalanche